"Not as We" is a 2008 song from Alanis Morissette's seventh studio album, Flavors of Entanglement. The song premiered on the American television series House in season 4 of episode 3, "97 Seconds". "Not as We" was remixed and released as the second single from Flavors of Entanglement in North America, while "In Praise of the Vulnerable Man" was released as the second single in Europe.  The single was released to radio on October 13, 2008.  On November 25, 2008 the Not as We (Remixes) EP was released in Canada. The EP includes the radio edit and six other remixes.

Track listing

CD Single
 "Not as We" (Radio Edit)
 "Not as We" (Album Version)

DMD Maxi Remix EP
 "Not as We" (Radio Edit)
 "Not as We" (Jack Shaft Radio Edit)
 "Not as We" (Blow-Up Edit)
 "Not as We" (Dangerous Muse Edit)
 "Not as We" (Eddie Amador's multipressor Edit)
 "Not as We" (DJ Lynnwood's Reborn Edit)
 "Not as We" (Holosound Edit)

 Digital Remixes
 "Not as We" (Blow-Up Mix) - 7:36
 "Not as We" (Dangerous Muse Remix) - 7:46
 "Not as We" (DJ Lynnewood's Reborn Remix) - 8:57
 "Not as We" (Eddie Amador's Multipressor Remix) - 7:47
 "Not as We" (Holosound Mix) - 7:33
 "Not as We" (Jack Shaft Extended Edit) - 7:02

The Album Version is a piano-driven ballad while the shorter radio edit adds guitars, bass and background effects and starts with the first line of the song while the Album Version has an instrumental opening. The music video uses the radio edit.

Music video
The music video, directed by James Whitaker and produced through RSA's promo division Black Dog Films, was shot in Los Angeles on September 10, 2008. It features imagery identifiable as being shot at Half Moon Bay. It premiered on Yahoo! Music on the night of October 2, 2008 and features Morissette in various stages on the path to emotional recovery.

Charts
The song unexpectedly charted when the album was released due to downloads of the song, resulting in a position of 22 on the Billboard Bubbling Under Hot 100 Singles chart.  As of December 2008, the song had already sold 38,000 paid downloads, according to Billboard. The digital downloads also helped the song reach the lower parts of UK Singles Chart (#197) despite the single not being commercially released in the United Kingdom.

References

2008 singles
Alanis Morissette songs
Pop ballads
Rock ballads
Songs written by Alanis Morissette
Song recordings produced by Guy Sigsworth
2008 songs
Songs written by Guy Sigsworth